Charles Baillairgé (29 September 1826 – 10 May 1906) was an architect, land surveyor, civil engineer, and an author.

He was from a long line of sculptors, painters, and architects that began with his great grandfather, Jean Baillairgé.
He was involved in designing many projects that were under the supervision of his brother, Frédéric, who held a senior position with public works. He completed the neoclassical stone building for the Academy of Music (Music Hall) on rue Saint-Louis in Quebec city in 1853.

Charles Baillairgé and Thomas Fuller (architect) completed work in 1866 as the principal architects on the Parliament of Canada in Ottawa, Ontario, Canada.

Three of Baillairgé's works have been designated as National Historic Sites of Canada due to their remarkable architecture.  The Bon-Pasteur Chapel (1868), a rectangular five-storey stone-faced chapel with a gable roof is part of the motherhouse of the Sisters of the Good Shepherd in Quebec City, designed by Charles Baillairgé, was designated a National Historic Site in 1975 as an outstanding example of religious architecture in Quebec.
Baillairgé's Têtu House (1854),  a three-storey, stone townhouse designed in the Neoclassical style by Charles Baillairgé in the same city was designated a National Historic Site in 1973 as one of the most remarkable examples of a Neoclassical townhouse built in Canada during the mid-19th century.  The Church of Sainte-Marie (1859) in Sainte-Marie was designated in 2006 due to the unique interiors designed by Baillairgé.

Charles Philippe Ferdinand Baillairgé designed a Roman Catholic church and sacristy, 1849 in Beauport, Quebec. He designed a Roman Catholic church in St. Elzear, Quebec 1852. He designed a Roman Catholic church 1853-7 in L'Isle Verte, Quebec. He designed Eglise Ste. Marie, 1854 in Ste-Marie, Quebec. He designed a Roman Catholic church, 1854–56 in St. Romuald, Quebec. He designed Eglise St. Patrice, 1855–57 in Riviere-Du-Loup, Quebec, which burned in 1883, and was rebuilt. He designed a Roman Catholic church, 1861 in Ste. Marguerite, Quebec.
With Joseph F. Peachy, Baillairgé designed the interiors for a Roman Catholic church, Ile d'Orleans, 1863  in St. Laurent, Quebec.
He designed a private chapel (1886) at his summer residence; now relocated at La Guadeloupe, Frontenac Co. In 1889, he restored the Breakneck Stairs in Quebec City, the city's oldest stairway.

Works

References 

 Christina Cameron. "Baillairgé, Charles", in Dictionary of Canadian Biography Online, University of Toronto and Université Laval, 2000
 Cameron, Christina (1989). Charles Baillairgé: Architect and Engineer, McGill-Queen's Press, 201 p. (preview)
 Répertoire du patrimoine culturel du Québec (http://www.patrimoine-culturel.gouv.qc.ca/RPCQ/detailPge.do?methode=consulterOngletInfoHistorique&pgeId=7227)

External 
Historic Places in Canada

1828 births
1906 deaths
Canadian architects
Fellows of the Royal Society of Canada
French Quebecers
People from Quebec City
Members of the Royal Canadian Academy of Arts